The UK Singles Chart is one of many music charts compiled by the Official Charts Company that calculates the best-selling singles of the week in the United Kingdom. Before 2004, the chart was only based on the sales of physical singles. This list shows singles that peaked in the Top 10 of the UK Singles Chart during 1960, as well as singles which peaked in 1959 and 1961 but were in the top 10 in 1960. The entry date is when the single appeared in the top 10 for the first time (week ending, as published by the Official Charts Company, which is six days after the chart is announced).

Ninety-five singles were in the top ten in 1960. Ten singles from 1959 remained in the top 10 for several weeks at the beginning of the year, while "I Love You" by Cliff Richard and The Shadows, and "Poetry in Motion" by Johnny Tillotson were both released in 1960 but did not reach their peak until 1961. "Little White Bull" by Tommy Steele, "Rawhide" by Frankie Laine, "Seven Little Girls Sitting in the Backseat" by The Avons and "Staccato's Theme" by Elmer Bernstein, were the singles from 1959 to reach their peak in 1960. Twenty artists scored multiple entries in the top 10 in 1960. Billy Fury, The Drifters, Ken Dodd, Rolf Harris, Roy Orbison and Sam Cooke were among the many artists who achieved their first UK charting top 10 single in 1960.

The 1959 Christmas number-one, "What Do You Want to Make Those Eyes at Me For?" by Emile Ford & The Checkmates, remained at number-one for the first four weeks of 1960. The first new number-one single of the year was "Starry Eyed" by Michael Holliday. Overall, seventeen different singles peaked at number-one in 1960, with The Shadows (3, including two entries with Cliff Richard) having the most singles hit that position.

Background

Multiple entries
Ninety-five singles charted in the top 10 in 1960, with eighty-seven singles reaching their peak this year.

Twenty artists scored multiple entries in the top 10 in 1960. The Shadows secured the record for most top 10 hits in 1960 with eight hit singles.

Jimmy Jones was one of a number of artists with two top-ten entries, including the number-one single "Good Timin'". Bobby Darin, Duane Eddy, Max Bygraves, Neil Sedaka and Tommy Steele were among the other artists who had multiple top 10 entries in 1960.

Chart debuts
Thirty artists achieved their first top 10 single in 1960, either as a lead or featured artist.  Jimmy Jones and Johnny Preston both had one other entry in their breakthrough year.

The following table (collapsed on desktop site) does not include acts who had previously charted as part of a group and secured their first top 10 solo single.

Notes
The Shadows scored two singles independent of Cliff Richard for the first time in 1960, starting with "Apache" reaching number one in August. They followed it up with the double single "Man of Mystery"/"The Stranger" peaking at number 5 in December. Peter Sellers had previously achieved two top 10 singles as a member of The Goons.

Songs from films
Original songs from various films entered the top 10 throughout the year. These included "A Voice in the Wilderness" (from Expresso Bongo ), "Theme from "A Summer Place"" (A Summer Place), Do You Mind (Let's Get Married), "Because They're Young" (Because They're Young), "Itsy Bitsy Teenie Weenie Yellow Polkadot Bikini" (One, Two, Three) and "As Long as He Needs Me" (Oliver!).

Additionally, earlier versions of "Way Down Yonder in New Orleans" had appeared in several films prior to 1960, namely Is Everybody Happy? (1943), Somebody Loves Me (1952), The Benny Goodman Story (1955) and The Gene Krupa Story (1959). "Clementine" featured as background music in The Grapes of Wrath (under the title "Oh My Darling, Clementine") before it was recorded by Bobby Darin. Fats Waller produced an instrumental version of "Ain't Misbehavin'" in 1929 and this was re-recorded with vocals for the 1943 film Stormy Weather. "Apache" was inspired by the film of the same name, originally recorded in instrumental version by composer Jerry Lordan before famously being released by The Shadows. The comedy song "Goodness Gracious Me" was due to be included on the soundtrack of The Millionairess but it was rejected by the producers. The stand-alone single was eventually used to promote the film.

Best-selling singles
Until 1970 there was no universally recognised year-end best-sellers list. However, in 2011 the Official Charts Company released a list of the best-selling song of each year in chart history from 1952 to date. According to the list, "It's Now or Never" by Elvis Presley is officially recorded as the biggest-selling single of 1960. "It's Now or Never" (9) also ranked in the top 10 best-selling singles of the decade.

Top-ten singles
Key

Entries by artist

The following table shows artists who achieved two or more top 10 entries in 1960, including singles that reached their peak in 1959 or 1961. The figures include both main artists and featured artists. The total number of weeks an artist spent in the top ten in 1960 is also shown.

Notes

 "Poetry in Motion" reached its peak of number one on 18 January 1961 (week ending).
 "Red River Rock" re-entered the top 10 at number 10 on 14 January 1960 (week ending).
 "Seven Little Girls Sitting in the Backseat" re-entered the top 10 at number 10 on 4 February 1960 (week ending).
 "Rawhide" re-entered the top 10 at number 6 on 7 January 1960 (week ending) for 3 weeks.
 "Little White Bull" re-entered the top 10 at number 10 on 11 February 1960 (week ending).
 "On a Slow Boat to China" re-entered the top 10 at number 10 on 6 April 1960 (week ending).
 "You Got What It Takes" re-entered the top 10 at number 9 on 6 April 1960 (week ending) for 3 weeks.
 "Wild One" re-entered the top 10 at number 9 on 13 April 1960 (week ending).
 "Cathy's Clown" is recorded as the best-selling single of the year by some sources but the Official Charts Company lists "It's Now or Never" as its best-seller.
 "Sweet Nothin's" re-entered the top 10 at number 9 on 22 June 1960 (week ending) for 2 weeks.
 "I Wanna Go Home" re-entered the top 10 at number 9 on 27 July 1960 (week ending) for 2 weeks.
 "Mama"/"Robot Man" re-entered the top 10 at number 7 on 10 August 1960 (week ending).
 "When Johnny Comes Marching Home"/"Made You" re-entered the top 10 at number 6 on 20 July 1960 (week ending) for 4 weeks.
 "Angela Jones" re-entered the top 10 at number 7 on 20 July 1960 (week ending) for 2 weeks.
 "If She Should Come to You" re-entered the top 10 at number 6 on 24 August 1960 (week ending) for 3 weeks.
 "Look for a Star" re-entered the top 10 at number 9 on 17 August 1960 (week ending).
 "Love is Like a Violin" re-entered the top 10 at number 8 on 21 September 1960 (week ending).
 "As Long as He Needs Me" re-entered the top 10 at number 5 on 19 October 1960 (week ending) for 9 weeks.
 "Chain Gang" re-entered the top 10 at number 9 on 2 November 1960 (week ending).
 "Please Help Me, I'm Falling" re-entered the top 10 at number 10 on 2 November 1960 (week ending).
 "Let's Think About Living" re-entered the top 10 at number 10 on 7 December 1960 (week ending).
 "Man of Mystery"/"The Stranger" re-entered the top 10 at number 7 on 18 January 1961 (week ending) for 2 weeks.
 "Goodness Gracious Me" re-entered the top 10 at number 7 on 11 January 1960 (week ending) for 3 weeks.
 Figure includes single that peaked in 1959.
 Figure includes single that peaked in 1961.
 Figure includes single that first charted in 1959 but peaked in 1960.

See also
1960 in British music
List of number-one singles from the 1960s (UK)

References
General

Specific

External links
1960 singles chart archive at the Official Charts Company (click on relevant week)

1960 record charts
1960
1960 in British music